Parauari River is a tributary of the Maués Açu River of Amazonas state in north-western Brazil.  It lies about 300 km southeast of Manaus, the capital.

The river flows through the eastern part of the Alto Maués Ecological Station.
It combines with the Amanã River to form the Maués Açu River.

See also
List of rivers of Amazonas

References

Brazilian Ministry of Transport

Rivers of Amazonas (Brazilian state)